Lou Cusanovich (June 14, 1912 - February 6, 1985) was an American politician who was a member of the California State Assembly from 1957 to 1966 and a member of the California State Senate from 1966 to 1980.

Career
Cusanovich represented the San Fernando Valley in the California State Legislature for 23 years. He was a member of the Republican Party. In 1970, he served as the Majority Leader of the California State Senate.

References

1912 births
1985 deaths
Republican Party members of the California State Assembly
Republican Party California state senators
Politicians from Los Angeles